The following article is a list of characters from the manga series Ayakashi Triangle.

Main characters

Matsuri Kazamaki 

Matsuri is the main male protagonist of the series. He is a young exorcist ninja from the Kazamaki clan, specializing in Wind Jutsu. He is currently training to take over his grandfather's position as the head of the clan. Matsuri is a carefree person in all areas, but very responsible when it comes to acting as an exorcist ninja, apart from having a great talent for this. When he was young, Matsuri used to be afraid of ayakashi, until he met Suzu Kanade, a girl who, like him, was also able to see ayakashi; witnessing Suzu interacting with them led Matsuri to overcome his fear, in addition to developing a kind of admiration, as well as romantic feelings for her. Furthermore, he acts strict in terms of protecting Suzu, who cares deeply for her due to her carelessness in trusting too much on ayakashi. At the beginning of the series, Matsuri appears as a boy with dark red hair, but when he seals away most of Shirogane's power into a scroll, the King of Ayakashi turns Matsuri into a silver-haired girl.
Matsuri struggles to fit in with his new life, though he slowly begins to befriend Suzu's friends, Yayo and Lucy. He is initially very resolute in his mission to protect Suzu, and maintains a grudge against various Ayakashi, but eventually overcomes these feelings when he is reunited with various ayakashi he and Suzu had befriended as children.

He is a master of various wind-based techniques, with one of his primary skills being the ability to dispel a possession with the use of his Pinwheel, allowing him to leave the hosts unharmed. After having his techniques temporarily sealed away by Garaku, he masters the "Inner Wind" technique, allowing him to strike Ayakashi with greated force, as well as dispel possessions within himse.f

Suzu Kanade 

Suzu is the main female protagonist of the series. Suzu loves to play with ayakashi, considering them adorable. However, the fact that she trusts them so much makes her put herself in dangerous situations many times. These situations are due to her being an Ayakashi Medium, a human being with an excess of vital energy and therefore attracts Ayakashi. Suzu is a childhood friend of Matsuri, for whom she has a crush on, even after he is turned into a girl.

She is shown to be very trusting of Ayakashi, often attempting to make peace with them when they cause disasters in the area, and finding herself saddened when they are struck down. Resolving to become stronger and independent, she learns several techniques through Garaku; her primary ability being to make an "Omokage", a copy of herself which she can control remotely, as well as channeling her excess vital energy into origami, allowing her to use them as projectiles to hit foes at range.

Shirogane 

Shirogane is the King of Ayakashi. Although his true form is that of a gigantic feline, when he suppresses his power he appears as an overweight cat wearing a bib; a form he gets stuck in when most of his powers are sealed into a scroll by Matsuri. Shirogane wants to devour Suzu to gain more power.

Ninokuru clan

Soga Ninokuru 

Soga is a exorcist ninja from the Ninokuru clan, known for his tremendous speed. Soga met Matsuri on a mission long before the events of the series, where he underestimated him at first, but after seeing his skills, he came to regard him as his rival and friend. He is a serious and very cold person, but acts tremendously flustered in front of women, even Matsuri, who despite knowing that she is was originally a boy, has to remember this in many situations in order not to be nervous in front of her; both have a good relationship, where they even help each other in battles.

Haya Ninokuru 

Haya is a female exorcist ninja apprentice from the Ninokuru clan and the younger sister of Soga. She looks up to her older brother and idolize him. She wants to fix his one weakness and make it so that he doesn't get flustered around girls. Meeting Matsuri, she now views the older girl as her future sister-in-law.

Muga Ninokuru 

Muga is Soga's father and the current head of the Ninokuru exorcist ninja clan.

Ponosuke Ninokuru 

Ponosuke is a humanoid pigeon ayakashi that serves the Ninokuru clan, working directly under Soga, to whom he is deeply loyal because Soga once saved him from being devoured by a cat.

Hokusai High School

Yayoi Toba 

Yayoi, nicknamed , is a classmate of Matsuri and Suzu who, along with Lu, has been friends with the latter since middle school, and neither she nor Lu know that Matsuri is actually a boy. She is energetic, cheerful and somewhat noisy, yet she is one of the most studious students of Hokusai High School. She is also in the habit of sexually harassing Suzu and other girls, groping many parts of their bodies against their will, something that really bothers Matsuri, which makes Yayo think that he doesn't like her, until both clear up their emotions and continue to be friends.

Lucy Tsukioka 

Lucy, nicknamed , is a classmate of Matsuri and Suzu who, along with Yayo, has been friends with the latter since middle school, and neither she nor Yayo know that Matsuri is actually a boy. Being partly foreign and from a wealthy family, she is obsessed with otaku culture and the supernatural, and although she is somewhat shy and quiet, Lu is actually a cell phone and social media addict, taking and then posting pictures of whatever she deems "postworthy."

Masurao Sujimori 

Masurao is a former mercenary who is now the English teacher at Hokusai High School.

Ayakashi

Human-faced Spider 

A skeletal, spider-like ayakashi that causes car accidents on a country road until Matsuri exorcises him in the first chapter.

Tadare 

An oni-like ayakashi that was sealed in  almost two hundred years prior to the events of the series, until Shirogane broke the seal that held him in the hope of recruiting him as a minion. Instead, Tadare betrays him when he realizes he could become the new King of Ayakashi by eating Suzu, but is easily defeated by Matsuri.

Garaku Utagawa 

Garaku is a famous painter in the human world, but in reality, he is not human, but an ayakashi with human-like features who has existed since the Edo period. Garaku likes to spend time painting, in addition to loving cats, which is why he considers himself a follower of Shirogane and is very affectionate with him, much to the cat's irritation.

Omokage Shadow 

An Omokage Shadow is an ayakashi capable of becoming a duplicate of a living person, being visible even to normal humans. An Omokage has no personality of its own and its sole purpose is to satisfy the desire of the human being it is personifying.

Ikon 

Ikon are a recurring type of ayakashi made of negative human thoughts, which proliferate by taking haku from humans and other ayakashi.

Sosuke Hinojiki 

Sosuke is a Jinyo born from an Ikon. He introduces himself to Suzu as another human who can see ayakashi, and asks her to heal an injured one he found. Once she does it, Sosuke eats the healed ayakashi, revealing it was all a trick to taste Suzu’s haku and feed on her power, but he is ultimately destroyed by the combined efforts of Matsuri and Shirogane.

Bottle-nosed Roller 

The Bottle-nosed Roller is a low-ranking ayakashi that looks like a small bottle of sake with eyeballs. It is not harmful, but has the problematic habit of appearing out of nowhere, causing humans to trip over it and fall.

Tanumaro 

Tanumaro is an ayakashi whose appearance is a mixture of tanuki and kettle. He is able to release a cloud of steam capable of trapping people in uncomfortable illusions, although he does not control what they will see. Years prior, Tanumaro was one of many ayakashi Suzu and Matsuri befriended, until the latter drove him away when he began suspecting every ayakashi is a threat to her. In the present, when Suzu becomes the new King of Ayakashi, Tanumaro rejects her and traps Matsuri in an illusion, as he believes humans and ayakashi can’t live together, but the duo manage to convince him otherwise. In the end, Tanumaro makes peace with Matsuri and accepts Suzu as the new King of Ayakashi.

Chochi 

A mischievous ayakashi that looks like a paper lantern with a face.

Other characters

Seigen Kazamaki 

Seigen is Matsuri's grandfather, his mentor, and the current head of the Kazamaki clan.

Reo Korogi 

Reo is an exorcist ninja who also happens to be an artisan, making and maintaining equipment out of her family's toy store. She makes, repairs, and modifies equipment used by exorcist ninja, including ninja suits, training robots and other things. She treats her job with a huge amount of enthusiasm, and is even happy when her equipment breaks, because that just lets her build it again but better.

Shishimaru Korogi 

Shishimaru is Reo's father, who trained her to be an artisan. While acknowledging his daughter's talent, he still sees her as just an apprentice.

Ritta Kanade 

Ritta is Suzu's younger brother, who is unaware Matsuri is actually a boy and develops a crush on him in his female form.

Mr. and Mrs. Kanade 
Mr. and Mrs. Kanade
They are the parents of Suzu and Ritta. The couple runs a café called Melody Bell. The mother has a cheerful and friendly personality, while the father is calm but a little worried.

References

Ayakashi Triangle